Lalkuan is a Nagar Panchayat in the Nainital district of the Indian state of Uttarakhand.

Demographics
In the 2011 India census, Lalkuan had a population of 7,644. Males constituted 55% of the population and females 45%. Lalkuan had an average literacy rate of 75%, higher than the national average of 59.5%: male literacy was 76% and female literacy was 74%. In Lalkuan, 12% of the population was under 6 years of age. Hindi, Kumauni and Punjabi are the main languages spoken there.

Geography 
It is situated 80 km from Bareilly on Nainital Road, 24 km from Rudrapur, 6 km from Pantnagar Airport, and 16 km from Haldwani.

References

Cities and towns in Nainital district